Prunus mume is a Chinese tree species classified in the Armeniaca section of the genus Prunus subgenus Prunus. Its common names include Chinese plum, Japanese plum, and Japanese apricot. The flower, long a beloved subject in the traditional painting and poetry of Sinospheric countries (including China, Korea, Vietnam, and Japan), is usually called plum blossom. This distinct tree species is related to both the plum and apricot trees. Although generally referred to as a plum in English, it is more closely related to the apricot.
In East Asian cuisine (Chinese, Japanese and Korean and Vietnamese cuisine), the fruit of the tree is used in juices, as a flavouring for alcohol, as a pickle and in sauces. It is also used in traditional medicine.

The tree's flowering in late winter and early spring is highly regarded as a seasonal symbol.

Prunus mume should not be confused with Prunus salicina, a related species also grown in China, Japan, Korea and Vietnam. Another tree, Prunus japonica, is also a separate species despite having a Latin name similar to Prunus mume'''s common name.

OriginPrunus mume originated around the Yangtze River in the south of China. It was later introduced to Japan, Korea and Vietnam.

DescriptionPrunus mume is a deciduous tree that starts to flower in mid-winter, typically around January until late February in East Asia. They have colors in varying shades of white, pink, and red. The leaves appear shortly after the petals fall, are oval-shaped with a pointed tip, and are 4–8 cm long and 2.5–5 cm wide. The fruit ripens in early summer, around June and July in East Asia, and coincides with the East Asian rainy season, the meiyu (梅雨, "plum rain"). The skin turns yellow, sometimes with a red blush, as it ripens, and the flesh becomes yellow. The tree is cultivated for its fruit and flowers.

Names
The scientific name combines the Latin prūnus (“plum tree”) and the obsolete Japanese 梅 (mume, “plum”). The plant is known by a number of different names in English, including Chinese plum and Japanese apricot. An alternative name is ume or mume. Another alternative name is  mei.

The flower is known as the meihua in Chinese, which came to be translated as "plum blossom" or sometimes as "flowering plum". The term "winter plum" may be used too, specifically with regard to the depiction of the flower with its early blooming in Chinese painting.

In Chinese it is called mei (梅) and the fruit is called meizi (梅子). The Japanese name is ume (kanji: 梅; hiragana: うめ), while the Korean name is maesil (hangul: 매실; hanja: 梅實). The Japanese and Korean terms derive from Middle Chinese, in which the pronunciation is thought to have been muəi. The Vietnamese name is mai or mơ (although mai vàng refers to a different plant, Ochna integerrima, in southern Vietnam).

Varieties

Ornamental tree varieties and cultivars of P. mume have been cultivated for planting in various gardens throughout East Asia, and for cut blossoming branches used in flower arrangements.

Chinese varieties
In China, there are over 300 recorded cultivars of Prunus mume. These are classified by phylogenetics (P. mume and two hybrids) in branches, type of branches in groups, and characteristics of flowers in several forms:

Zhizhimei Lei [Upright Mei Group], Prunus mume var. typica Pinzimei Xing [Pleiocarpa Form]
 Jiangmei Xing [Single Flowered Form]
 Gongfen Xing [Pink Double Form]
 Yudie Xing [Alboplena Form]
 Huangxiang Xing [Flavescens Form]
 Lü'e Xing [Green Calyx Form]
 Sajin Xing [Versicolor Form]
 Zhusha Xing [Cinnabar Purple Form]
Chuizhimei Lei [Pendulous Mei Group], Prunus mume var. pendula Fenhua Chuizhi Xing [Pink Pendulous Form]
 Wubao Chuizhi Xing [Versicolor Pendulous Form]
 Canxue Chuizhi Xing [Albiflora Pendulous Form]
 Baibi Chuizhi Xing [Viridiflora Pendulous Form]
 Guhong Chuizhi Xing [Atropurpurea Pendulous Form]
Longyoumei Lei [Tortuous Dragon Group], Prunus mume var. tortuosaXingmei Lei [Apricot Mei Group], Prunus mume var. bungoYinglimei Lei [Blireiana Group], Prunus × blireana, Prunus cerasifera 'Pissardii' × Prunus mume AlphandiiIt is disputed whether Prunus zhengheensis is a separate species or conspecific with Prunus mume. It is found in the Fujian province of China. It is only known from one county, Zhenghe. The yellow fruit is delectable, and aside from its height it is indistinguishable from P. mume.

Japanese varieties
In Japan, ornamental Prunus mume cultivars are classified into yabai (wild), hibai (red), and bungo (Bungo Province) types. The bungo trees are also grown for fruit and are hybrids between Prunus mume and apricot. The hibai trees have red heartwood and most of them have red flowers. The yabai trees are also used as grafting stock. Among yabai trees, Nankoume is very popular variety in Japan, and which fruits are mainly used for making Umeboshi.

Uses

Culinary use
 Beverage 

In China and Taiwan, suanmeitang ("sour plum juice") is made from smoked plums, called wumei. The plum juice is extracted by boiling smoked plums in water and sweetened with sugar to make suanmeitang. It ranges from light pinkish-orange to purplish black in colour and often has a smoky and slightly salty taste. It is traditionally flavoured with sweet osmanthus flowers, and is enjoyed chilled, usually in summer.

In Korea, both the flowers and the fruits are used to make tea. Maehwa-cha ("plum blossom tea") is made by infusing the flowers in hot water. Maesil-cha ("plum tea") is made by mixing water with maesil-cheong (plum syrup) and is served either hot or cold. In Japan, similar drink made from green plums, tastes sweet and tangy, is considered a cold, refreshing drink and is often enjoyed in the summer.

 Condiment 

A thick, sweet Chinese sauce called meijiang or meizijiang, usually translated as "plum sauce", is also made from the plums, along with other ingredients such as sugar, vinegar, salt, ginger, chili, and garlic.  Similar to duck sauce, it is used as a condiment for various Chinese dishes, including poultry dishes and egg rolls.

In Korea, maesil-cheong ("plum syrup"), an anti-microbial syrup made by sugaring ripe plums, is used as a condiment and sugar substitute. It can be made by simply mixing plums and sugar together, and then leaving them for about 100 days. To make syrup, the ratio of sugar to plum should be at least 1:1 to prevent fermentation, by which the liquid may turn into plum wine. The plums can be removed after 100 days, and the syrup can be consumed right away, or mature for a year or more.

 Flower pancake 

In Korea, hwajeon ("flower pancake") can be made with plum blossoms. Called maehwa-jeon ("plum blossom pancake"), the pancake dish is usually sweet, with honey as an ingredient.

 Liquor 

Plum liquor, also known as plum wine, is popular in both Japan and Korea, and is also produced in China. Umeshu ("plum wine") is a Japanese alcoholic drink made by steeping green plums in shōchū (clear liquor). It is sweet and smooth. A similar liquor in Korea, called maesil-ju ("plum wine"), is marketed under various brand names, including Mae hwa soo, Matchsoon and Seoljungmae.  Both the Japanese and Korean varieties of plum liquor are available with whole plum fruits contained in the bottle. In China, plum wine is called méijiǔ.

In Taiwan, a popular 1950s innovation over the Japanese-style plum wine is the wumeijiu ("smoked plum liquor"), which is made by mixing two types of plum liquor, meijiu made of P. mume and lijiu made of P. salicina, and oolong tea liquor.

In Vietnam, ripe plums are macerated in sticky rice liquor. The resulting liquor is called . A brand selling plum liquor is Sơn Tinh.

 Pickled and preserved plums 

In Chinese cuisine, plums pickled with vinegar and salt are called suanmeizi ("sour plum fruits"), and have an intensely sour and salty flavour. They are generally made from unripe plum fruits. Huamei are Chinese preserved plums and refers to Chinese plums pickled in sugar, salt, and herbs. There are two general varieties: a dried variety, and a wet (pickled) variety.Umeboshi are pickled and dried plums. They are a Japanese specialty. Pickled with coarse salt, they are quite salty and sour, and therefore eaten sparingly. They are often red in colour when purple shiso leaves are used.  Plums used for making umeboshi are harvested in late May or early June, while they are ripe enough in yellow, and layered with much salt.  They are weighed down with a heavy stone (or some more modern implement) until late August.  They are then dried in the sun on bamboo mats for several days (they are returned to the salt at night). The flavonoid pigment in shiso leaves gives them their distinctive colour and a richer flavour. Umeboshi are generally eaten with rice as part of a bento (boxed lunch), although they may also be used in makizushi (rolled sushi). Umeboshi are also used as a popular filling for rice balls (onigiri) wrapped in laver. Makizushi made with plums may be made with either umeboshi or bainiku (umeboshi paste), often in conjunction with green shiso leaves. A byproduct of umeboshi production is umeboshi vinegar, a salty, sour condiment.

In Korea, there is 'maesil-jangajji' which is similar to 'Umeboshi'. It is a common side dish in Korea.

The best fruit for this are from the forest around the Hương Pagoda in Hà Tây Province.

Traditional medicinePrunus mume is a common fruit in Asia and used in traditional Chinese medicine.

Cultural significance
Plum blossoms have been well loved and celebrated across the East Asian cultural sphere, which includes China, Vietnam, Korea, and Japan.

East Asia
Chinese

The plum blossom, which is known as the meihua, is one of the most beloved flowers in China and has been frequently depicted in Chinese art and poetry for centuries. The plum blossom is seen as a symbol of winter and a harbinger of spring. The blossoms are so beloved because they are viewed as blooming most vibrantly amidst the winter snow, exuding an ethereal elegance, while their fragrance is noticed to still subtly pervade the air at even the coldest times of the year. Therefore, the plum blossom came to symbolize perseverance and hope, as well as beauty, purity, and the transitoriness of life. In Confucianism, the plum blossom stands for the principles and values of virtue. More recently, it has also been used as a metaphor to symbolize revolutionary struggle since the turn of the 20th century.

Because it blossoms in the cold winter, the plum blossom is regarded as one of the "Three Friends of Winter", along with pine, and bamboo. The plum blossom is also regarded as one of the "Four Gentlemen" of flowers in Chinese art together with the orchid, chrysanthemum, and bamboo.  It is one of the "Flowers of the Four Seasons", which consist of the orchid (spring), the lotus (summer), the chrysanthemum (autumn) and the plum blossom (winter). These groupings are seen repeatedly in the Chinese aesthetic of art, painting, literature, and garden design.

An example of the plum blossom's literary significance is found in the life and work of poet Lin Bu of the Song dynasty (960–1279). For much of his later life, Lin Bu lived in quiet reclusion on a cottage by West Lake in Hangzhou, China. According to stories, he loved plum blossoms and cranes so much that he considered the plum blossom of Solitary Hill at West Lake as his wife and the cranes of the lake as his children, thus he could live peacefully in solitude. One of his most famous poems is "Little Plum Blossom of Hill Garden". The Chinese text as well as a translation follows:

As with the literary culture amongst the educated of the time, Lin Bu's poems were discussed in several Song dynasty era commentaries on poetry. Wang Junqing remarked after quoting the third and fourth line: "This is from Lin Hejing's [Lin Bu's] plum blossom poem. Yet these lines might just as well be applied to the flowering apricot, peach, or pear."—a comparison of the flowers with the plum blossom to which the renowned Song dynasty poet Su Dongpo replied, "Well, yes, they might. But I'm afraid the flowers of those other trees wouldn't presume to accept such praise." Plum blossoms inspired many people of the era.

Legend has it that once on the 7th day of the 1st lunar month, while Princess Shouyang, daughter of Emperor Wu of Liu Song, was resting under the eaves of Hanzhang Palace near the plum trees after wandering in the gardens, a plum blossom drifted down onto her fair face, leaving a floral imprint on her forehead that enhanced her beauty further. The court ladies were said to be so impressed that they started decorating their own foreheads with a small delicate plum blossom design. This is also the mythical origin of the floral fashion, meihua chuang (梅花妝; literally "plum blossom makeup"), that originated in the Southern Dynasties (420–589) and became popular amongst ladies in the Tang (618–907) and Song (960–1279) dynasties. The markings of plum blossom designs on the foreheads of court ladies were usually made with paintlike materials such as sorghum powder, gold powder, paper, jade and other tint substances. Princess Shouyang is celebrated as the goddess of the plum blossom in Chinese culture.

During the Ming dynasty (1368–1644), the garden designer Ji Cheng wrote his definitive garden architecture monograph Yuanye and in it he described the plum tree as the "beautiful woman of the forest and moon". The appreciation of nature at night plays an important role in Chinese gardens, for this reason there are classical pavilions for the tradition of viewing plum blossoms by the moonlight. The flowers are viewed and enjoyed by many as annual plum blossom festivals take place in the blooming seasons of the meihua. The festivals take place throughout China (for example, West Lake in Hangzhou and scenic spots near Zijin Mountain in Nanjing amongst other places). Plum blossoms are often used as decoration during the Spring Festival (Chinese New Year) and remain popular in the miniature gardening plants of the art penjing. Branches of plum blossoms are often arranged in porcelain or ceramic vases, such as the meiping (literally "plum vase"). These vases can hold single branches of plum blossoms and are traditionally used to display the blossoms in a home since the early Song dynasty (960–1279).

The Moy Yat lineage of Wing Chun kung fu uses a red plum flower blossom as its symbol. The plum blossoms are featured on one of the four flowers that appear on mahjong tile sets, where mei is usually simply translated as "plum" in English.

It has been suggested that the Japanese practice of cherry blossom viewing, Hanami, may have originated from a Chinese custom of poetry and wine under plum blossom trees that was replicated by Japanese elites. This is supported by the fact that Hanami started in urban areas rather than rural areas, and that classic Japanese poetry does not associate cherry blossoms with merriness like Hanami. However, the debate is charged with nationalist currents.

The National Flower of the Republic of China (Taiwan) was officially designated as the plum blossom (Prunus Mei) by the Executive Yuan of the Republic of China on July 21, 1964. The plum blossom is symbol for resilience and perseverance in the face of adversity during the harsh winter. The triple grouping of stamens (three stamens per petal) on the national emblem represents Sun Yat-sen's Three Principles of the People, while the five petals symbolize the five branches of the government.National Flag, Anthem and Flower. Retrieved 9 August 2011. It also serves as the logo of China Airlines, the national carrier of Taiwan (the Republic of China). The flower is featured on some New Taiwan dollar coins.

Korean

In Korea, the plum blossom is a symbol for spring.  It is a popular flower motif, amongst other flowers, for Korean embroidery. Maebyong are plum vases derived from the Chinese meiping and are traditionally used to hold branches of plum blossoms in Korea.

Japanese
Plum blossoms are often mentioned in Japanese poetry as a symbol of spring, as well as elegance and purity. When used in haiku or renga, they are a kigo or season word for early spring. The blossoms are associated with the Japanese bush warbler and depicted together on one of the twelve suits of hanafuda (Japanese playing cards). Plum blossoms were favored during the Nara period (710–794) until the emergence of the Heian period (794–1185) in which the cherry blossom was preferred.

Japanese tradition holds that the ume functions as a protective charm against evil, so the ume is traditionally planted in the northeast of the garden, the direction from which evil is believed to come. The eating of the pickled fruit for breakfast is also supposed to stave off misfortune.

Southeast Asia
Vietnamese
In Vietnam, due to the beauty of the tree and its flowers, the word mai is used to name girls. The largest hospital in Hanoi is named Bạch Mai (white plum blossom), another hospital in Hanoi is named Mai Hương ("the scent of plum"), situated in Hồng Mai (pink plum blossom) street. Hoàng Mai (yellow plum blossom) is the name of a district in Hanoi. Bạch Mai is also a long and old street in Hanoi. All these places are located in the south part of Hanoi, where, in the past, many P. mume trees were grown.

See also

 Chinese garden
 Chinese cuisine
 Japanese cuisine
 Korean cuisine
 Vietnamese cuisine
 Prunus salicina''
 Greengage
 Typhoon Muifa, various typhoons named for the Macanese form of the Chinese word for the plum blossom

References

External links

China Online Museum: Chinese Plum Blossom
NPGS/GRIN - Prunus mume information
NDSU: A good history - Prunus mume
USDA Plant Profile for Prunus mume (Japanese apricot)

mume
Chinese culture
Trees of China
Trees of Japan
Trees of Korea
Trees of Laos
Trees of Taiwan
Trees of Vietnam
Fruits originating in Asia
Garden plants of Asia
Japanese cuisine
Japanese fruit
Ornamental trees
Plants used in bonsai
Apricots
Plants described in 1830
Endemic flora of China
Flora of Fujian